The Oaks Historic District, is a collection of historic homes and businesses in Beaumont, Texas. The area is roughly bound by I-10 to the north and Smart St. to the south and from 11th St. on the west to 1st St. to the east. Many of the historic homes are restored and still used as residences today. The district is just west of downtown.

Gallery

See also

References

External links

Buildings and structures in Beaumont, Texas